Trifurcula ridiculosa is a moth of the family Nepticulidae. It is only known from the Canary Islands: Tenerife, La Palma, La Gomera, El Hierro and Madeira, including Porto Santo island.

The wingspan is 4.1–4.5 mm for males and 3.8–4.1 mm for females. It probably breeds continuously. Larvae have been found in February, April, September, October and December. Adults emerged within three to six weeks after collecting.

The larvae feed on Lotus arabicus, Lotus campylocladus, Lotus glaucus, Lotus glinoides, Lotus pedunculatus and Lotus sessilifolius. They mine the leaves of their host plant. The mine consists of a long and very narrow corridor, following the leaf margin, suddenly widening into an elongated blotch. Small leaflets are almost entirely mined out. Pupation takes place outside of the mine.

External links
Review Of The Subgenus Trifurcula (Levarchama), With Two New Species (Lepidoptera: Nepticulidae)
bladmineerders.nl

Nepticulidae
Moths of Africa
Moths described in 1908